ULOC may refer to:

 Ultra Large Ore Carrier, see bulk carrier
 University of London Orienteering Club
 Uloc, a fictional world appearing in The Forgotten World of Uloc
 Unsecured line of credit, see Line of credit